Retro Active is a compilation album by the English rock band Def Leppard, released in 1993. The album features touched-up versions of B-sides and previously unreleased recordings from the band's recording sessions from 1984 to 1993. The album charted at number 9 on the Billboard 200 and No. 6 on the UK Albums Chart.

Overview
After releasing only five albums over the course of a twelve-year period, Def Leppard used Retro Active to break that habit, provide a treat for diehard fans, and close the door on the "Steve Clark" era of the band. Many of the tracks had previously been released as single B-sides.

According to singer Joe Elliott, the concept behind the album was envisioned after the success of the "Two Steps Behind" single. The song had originally been demoed solely by Elliott as an electric version in 1989, and was subsequently recorded by the band as an acoustic ballad at the suggestion of guitarist Phil Collen. When the producers of the film Last Action Hero contacted the band in 1993 to provide a new song for the soundtrack, the band were unable to record new material due to touring schedules and instead sent over the multitrack tape of the acoustic version of "Two Steps Behind", which was given strings by conductor Michael Kamen in April 1993 and included onto the film soundtrack. It would become the band's last Top 20 single in the US, reaching No. 12, and inspired the band to put the album together and re-record the electric version of the song.

"She's Too Tough" and the electric version of "Miss You in a Heartbeat" were both B-sides included as bonus tracks on Japanese pressings of Adrenalize. Written in 1985, "She's Too Tough" first appeared on the Helix album Wild in the Streets in 1987. "Miss You in a Heartbeat", meanwhile, was first written and demoed by guitarist Collen in 1991 and was originally recorded by the Law, a band featuring Paul Rodgers and the Who drummer Kenney Jones, for their self-titled album in 1991. Def Leppard later recorded their own version in April the following year, which they released as a B-side on the "Make Love Like a Man" single. After the band had recorded the new vocal, bass and drum parts for the electric version of the song, Collen overheard Elliott experimenting with the song on a piano. This led Elliott to record a piano and vocal version of the song, after which Collen, bassist Rick Savage and drummer Rick Allen added acoustic and electric guitars, bass guitar and drum parts in June 1993, creating the acoustic version that would be released as a single.

Two unfinished songs from the Hysteria recording sessions, "Desert Song" and "Fractured Love", were completed exclusively for the album. The album also features several covers, namely Sweet's "Action" (which charted higher than the original in the UK) and Mick Ronson's "Only After Dark".

The version of "Ride into the Sun" on the compilation is not the same as that which appeared on The Def Leppard E.P., but rather the 1987 re-recording. It differs slightly from the original B-side from the Hysteria era; the B-side featured a Rick Allen drum solo intro, whereas the version on Retro Active has a piano intro provided by Ian Hunter.

Retro Active features a hidden (final) track: a piano/vocal version of "Miss You in a Heartbeat", which also features an alternate acoustic guitar solo by Collen.

This is the first Def Leppard album to feature songs recorded with newly added guitarist Vivian Campbell.

Album cover

The album cover, by Nels Israelson and Hugh Syme, is a photograph of a lady sitting at a dressing table, looking in a mirror. However, if the cover is viewed at arm's length or from a distance, it takes the form of a skull (a type of vanitas art), the woman's head forming the left eye socket, and her reflected head in the mirror forming the right eye socket. The mirror itself forms the shape of the skull and the accessories on the dressing table form the nose, nostrils and teeth. It was inspired by Charles Allan Gilbert's most famous work, All Is Vanity (1892). An alternate version of the album cover exists, only released for promotional use. The only difference is the Def Leppard logo is represented in the most traditional style seen on Pyromania, Hysteria and Adrenalize. The band felt that, given Retro Actives sonically darker tone, that it would be best to shelve the bright colours of the logo.

Reception
In a 3.5 out of 5 review, Sputnikmusic wrote that while the compilation "cannot be rated super highly, it is extremely rare for a compilation album such as this to do so. With that in mind, this is indeed a pleasant surprise which will at least please some of Def Leppard’s longtime fans due to the relatively organic production levels used here. Importantly, a wise balance of song types is included within the 46 minute (60 if the three alternate versions are counted) duration, meaning that the accessible tracks resulted in this album still selling well and deservedly going top 10 in both the U.S & U.K."

Eduardo Rivadavia of AllMusic gave particular praise to "Desert Song" and "Fractured Love", citing them as Retro Active'''s "most distinctive tracks, harkening back to the band's early (pre-success) days with their rough power chords." He concludes by saying that overall, "this is an interesting release which marks the end of a long chapter in the band's history, following the death of guitarist and guiding force Steve Clark. While casual fans might find it confusing, Leppard fanatics will revel in its diversity and informative liner notes."

Rating the compilation 4 out of 5, Paul Evans of Rolling Stone notes that the band's "chief strength has always been the songs they write, and Retro Active underscores that appeal. From the Zeplike "Desert Song" to "She's Too Tough" and its feisty rock & roll, from the power ballad "Two Steps Behind" to "Ride Into the Sun," a raver from their 1979 debut, this is premium pop-metal - sharp hooks and engaging thunder."

Track listing

Track notes
 "Desert Song" was a previously unreleased outtake from the Hysteria album sessions (1984–87).
 "Fractured Love" was also a previously unreleased outtake from the Hysteria album sessions.
 "Action" was originally released on the "Make Love Like a Man" single; this version has re-recorded snare drums.
 "Two Steps Behind" was originally released on the "Make Love Like a Man" single. The acoustic version here has added strings from the original and is the same version released on the Last Action Hero soundtrack four months prior. The electric version of the song had never been released previously.
 "She's Too Tough" was released on the singles for "Heaven Is", "Tonight", and "Stand Up (Kick Love into Motion)", as well as the Japanese versions of Adrenalize before the drums were re-recorded for the version that appears here.
 "Miss You in a Heartbeat" was released on the "Make Love Like a Man" single as well as the Japanese versions of Adrenalize. All three versions that appear on this album are new recordings and had never been released before. The hidden track piano version (track 14) features just Joe Elliott on vocals and piano, along with some acoustic guitar by Phil Collen. The acoustic version (track 6) contains piano played by both Joe Elliott and Pete Woodroffe, along with other members of the band on acoustic instruments, while the electric version (track 12) contains the band on full electrical and electronic instruments.
 "Only After Dark" had previously appeared on the "Let's Get Rocked" single, and extra guitars were added for this release.
 "Ride Into the Sun" first appeared on the band's first commercial release, The Def Leppard E.P.''. The song was then re-recorded and released on the  "Hysteria" single in 1987, as well as some editions of "Love Bites" in 1988. This version is the same as the 1987 version but with rerecorded drums and a new intro.
 "From the Inside" appears as it did in its original release on the 1992 single release of "Have You Ever Needed Someone So Bad" and some single releases of "Stand Up (Kick Love into Motion)".
 "Ring of Fire" was originally released on the 1988 singles "Pour Some Sugar on Me" in the US and "Armageddon It" in the UK. The song was only partially re-recorded and amended for this release.
 "I Wanna Be Your Hero" was originally released on the 1987 singles "Animal" in the US and "Pour Some Sugar on Me" in the UK. The version here features a different intro and re-recorded drums.

Personnel
Rick Allen – drums
Vivian Campbell – electric guitars, acoustic guitars, backing vocals
Steve Clark – electric guitars
Phil Collen – electric guitars, acoustic guitars, backing vocals
Joe Elliott – lead vocals, backing vocals, rhythm guitar, piano, jungle orchestra on "Fractured Love"
Rick Savage – bass guitar, keyboards, backing vocals, rhythm guitar on “Ring of Fire”

Additional musicians
Ian Hunter – honky tonk messiah on "Ride into the Sun"
Michael Kamen – string arrangement on "Two Steps Behind" (acoustic version)
Robert John "Mutt" Lange – backing vocals on "Ring of Fire"
Fiachna Ó Braonáin – tin whistle on "From the Inside"
Liam Ó Maonlaí – grand piano on "From the Inside"
Peter O'Toole – mandolin on "From the Inside"
P.J. Smith – backing vocals on "Action"
Pete Woodroffe – piano on "Miss You in a Heartbeat" (acoustic version)

Production
Def Leppard – producer
Pete Woodroffe – engineer, mixing, co-producer on tracks 2-4, 6 & 14
Janfred Arendsen – engineer
Albert Boekholt – engineer
Giles Cowley – mixing
Freek Feenstra – engineer
Nigel Green – engineer
Steve McGaughlin – engineer
Erwin Musper – engineer
Nial O'Sullivan – mixing
Ronald Prent – engineer
Robert Scovill – engineer
Mike Shipley – engineer

Charts

Album

Singles

Certifications

References

Def Leppard compilation albums
B-side compilation albums
1993 compilation albums
Mercury Records compilation albums